XHAMO-FM is a radio station on 98.9 FM in Irapuato, Guanajuato, Mexico. XHAMO is owned by Radio Grupo Antonio Contreras and carries an adult contemporary format known as Éxitos 98.9.

History
XHAMO began as XEAMO-AM 870, a daytime-only station owned by Silvestre Razo Arredondo. It was sold to the current concessionaire in 1993 and cleared to migrate to FM in 2012.

References

Radio stations in Guanajuato
Radio stations established in 1981
1981 establishments in Mexico